Blockbuster is the first studio album by South Korean boy band Block B. The music video Nillili Mambo was released on October 16, 2012.

Release 
Blockbuster was released on October 19, 2012. They released two different versions of the album: one was limited edition, and the other was the normal edition. The album reached number ten on the Billboard World Album Chart.

Track listing 
The album's tracks are as follows:

Chart rankings
The chart rankings are as follows:

Sales and certifications

References

2012 debut albums
Block B albums
Kakao M albums